The 2017–18 UTSA Roadrunners men's basketball team represented the University of Texas at San Antonio during the 2017–18 NCAA Division I men's basketball season. The Roadrunners, led by second-year head coach Steve Henson, played their home games at the Convocation Center as members of Conference USA. They finished the season 20–15, 11–7 in C-USA play to finish in fifth place. They defeated UTEP in the first round of the C-USA tournament before losing in the quarterfinals to Marshall. They were invited to the CollegeInsider.com Tournament where they defeated Lamar in the first round and received a second round bye before losing in the quarterfinals to Sam Houston State.

Previous season
The Roadrunners finished the 2016–17 season 14–19, 8–10 in C-USA play to finish in the ninth place. They defeated Western Kentucky in the first round of the C-USA tournament before losing to top-seeded Middle Tennessee.

Offseason

Departures

Incoming transfers

Class of 2017 recruits

Class of 2018 recruits

Class of 2019 recruits

Roster

Schedule and results

|-
!colspan=9 style=| Exhibition

|-
!colspan=9 style=|Non-conference regular season

|-
!colspan=9 style=| Conference USA regular season

|-
!colspan=9 style=| Conference USA tournament

|-
!colspan=9 style=|CIT

References

UTSA Roadrunners men's basketball seasons
UTSA
UTSA
UTSA Roadrunners
UTSA Roadrunners